() is a khum (commune) in Tram Kak District, Takéo Province, Cambodia.

Administration 
As of 2019,  has 11 phums (villages) as follows.

References 

Communes of Takéo province
Tram Kak District